A vice squad is a police division whose focus is stopping public-order crimes like gambling, narcotics, prostitution, and illegal sales of alcohol.

Vice Squad are an English punk band.

Vice squad or Vice Squad may also refer to:

 Vice Squad (1953 film), a 1953 police procedural film
 Vice Squad (1959 film), a 1959 crime film
 Vice Squad (1978 film), a 1978 crime film
 Vice Squad (1982 film), a 1982 action film
 Vice Squad (TV series), a 2001 German series
 The Vice Squad, a 1931 Paramount film starring Paul Lukas

See also
 Miami Vice, a 1984 television crime drama series
 Miami Vice (film), a 2006 action crime thriller film and adaptation of the 1980s television series of the same name